Rao Kaixun (born April 1964) is a lieutenant general in the People's Liberation Army of China. In July 2019 he has been placed under investigation by the PLA's anti-corruption agency. Previously he served as deputy commander of the People's Liberation Army Strategic Support Force. He was promoted to the rank of major general (shao jiang) in 2010 and lieutenant general (zhong jiang) in 2017.

Education
Rao was born in Yuexi County, Sichuan, in April 1964. He is of Hui ethnicity. He graduated from PLA National Defence University.

Career
He enlisted in the People's Liberation Army in 1980. In 2010 he was promoted to become chief of staff of the 77th Group Army, after 30 years of grass-roots unit training. Two years later, he was appointed army commander of the 14th Group Army. In 2013, he was named head of the Operational Division of People's Liberation Army General Staff Department, replacing Bai Jianjun. That same year, he became head of Civil Defense Bureau of the Ministry of National Defense Mobilization of the Central Military Commission. In March 2016 he was appointed deputy commander of the People's Liberation Army Strategic Support Force. He concurrently served as its chief of staff in August 2017.

He was a delegate to the 12th and 13th National People's Congress.

Investigation
In July 2019 he was placed under investigation by the PLA's anti-corruption agency. Rao was ordered to resign as representative of the 13th National People's Congress. He was downgraded to deputy corps leader grade position.

References

1964 births
People from Yuexi County, Sichuan
Living people
PLA National Defence University alumni
Hui people
Delegates to the 12th National People's Congress
Delegates to the 13th National People's Congress
People's Liberation Army generals from Sichuan